The Battle of the Tarigo Convoy (sometimes referred to as the Action off Sfax) was a naval battle of World War II, part of the Battle of the Mediterranean. It was fought on 16 April 1941, between four British and three Italian destroyers, near the Kerkennah Islands off Sfax, in the Tunisian coast. The battle was named after the Italian flagship, the destroyer Luca Tarigo.

Control of the sea between Italy and Libya was heavily disputed as both sides sought to safeguard their own convoys while interdicting those of their opponent. Axis convoys to North Africa supplied the German and Italian armies there, and British attacks were based on Malta, itself dependent upon convoys.

The battle

In mid-April, 1941, a five-ship Axis convoy sailed from Naples, en route to Tripoli. It consisted of four German troopships (Adana, Arta, Aegina and Iserlohn) and an Italian ammunition ship (Sabaudia). The convoy was escorted by a  Luca Tarigo (flagship) and two s, Baleno and Lampo, all under orders from Commander Pietro de Cristofaro. The convoy was delayed by bad weather, sailing in the evening of 13 April.

The British had been alerted to the convoy's sailing by intercepted radio messages. On 15 April, a British Maryland reconnaissance plane sighted and shadowed the convoy. Two Italian SM.79s that were ordered to provide air cover did not arrive, due to the continuing bad weather. At least three of these destroyers were equipped with radar. The encounter took place as the Italian convoy maneuvered around the shallow waters surrounding the Kerkennah Islands.

By the use of the radar, the British force ambushed the Axis convoy in the dark. Three of the Axis transports were sunk, and the other two beached on the sandbar and became a total loss. Lampo was run aground and later salvaged, while Baleno sank in shallow waters. The flotilla commander, Commander de Cristofaro, on board Tarigo, had his leg shot off and later died of his wounds; he was posthumously awarded the Medaglia d'Oro (the highest Italian military decoration). While listing to port and sinking, Tarigo - now under the command of the only surviving officer, Ensign Ettore Bisagno - launched two torpedoes that hit HMS Mohawk astern and amidships. Mohawk capsized with her stern touching the sea bed; Jervis fired her main guns into Mohawks bow to completely sink her in of water. The outcome of the battle marked the end of the relatively unopposed Axis transport to Libya, which they had enjoyed since June 1940.

Aftermath

A total of 1,271 survivors were recovered of about 3,000 men on board.

Italian naval forces also found the wreckage of HMS Mohawk, settled on her port side in shallow water. During April, May, and June 1941, Italian divers, disguised as local fishermen, retrieved documents and other material from the wreck of Mohawk. In 1998, researchers asserted that documents recovered were essential to the later, successful Italian attack on Alexandria.

The destroyer Lampo was salvaged from the shallow water after a four-month effort, and repaired by May 1942. She was sunk again on 30 April 1943.  Adana sank several hours after the engagement, while the wreck of Arta was destroyed with explosive charges by the crew of the submarine HMS Upholder on the night of 26 April 1941.

Axis casualties are variously reported as 350, 700, or 1,800 men. British losses were 43, all of them crewmembers of Mohawk.

Notes

References

 Green, J; Massignani, A. (1998) The Naval War in the Mediterranean 1940-1943 Chatham Publishing. 

1941 in Italy
Allied naval victories in the battle of the Mediterranean
April 1941 events
Mediterranean convoys of World War II
Maritime incidents in April 1941
Naval battles of World War II involving Italy
Tarigo